John Claughton may refer to:

 John Alan Claughton (born 1956), English cricketer
 John Andrew Claughton (born 1978), English cricketer